Battle of Cabin Creek may refer to:

First Battle of Cabin Creek, a July 1863 engagement in Indian Territory
Second Battle of Cabin Creek, a September 1864 engagement on roughly the same ground
Cabin Creek battlefield, an eastern Oklahoma park which encompasses much of the land upon which the two engagements occurred